The Hermosa–Duhat–Balintawak Transmission Line (abbreviated as HB, RHB, 8LI1DUH-HER, and 8LI1QUE-DUH), also known as Hermosa–Marilao–Quezon Transmission Line, is a 230,000 volt, single-circuit, two-part transmission line in Metro Manila and Central Luzon, Philippines that connects Hermosa and Balintawak substations of National Grid Corporation of the Philippines (NGCP), with line segment termination at Manila Electric Company (Meralco) Duhat substation in Duhat, Bocaue, Bulacan.

History
The Hermosa–Duhat–Balintawak Transmission Line began construction in September 1993 and went into service in June 1994. It is operated by the privately owned National Grid Corporation of the Philippines (NGCP) since January 15, 2009, and previously by government-owned companies National Transmission Corporation (TransCo) and National Power Corporation (NAPOCOR). It was owned previously by NAPOCOR from June 1994 to March 1, 2003, and is owned currently by TransCo since March 1, 2003.

TransCo relocated its Santa Barbara Bridge–Villa del Sol segment through the Lahar-Affected Transmission Line Relocation project, using 30 replacement steel poles. It was completed in April 2003.

In 2007, 3 steel poles were relocated due to the construction of Dulalia Overpass using 2 existing steel poles (473 and 475) and 1 replacement steel pole (474). NAPOCOR-era steel pole 474 which is a suspension tower and has triangle tower design, however, was retired.

The cut-in connection to Meralco Duhat substation was constructed to avoid line overloading and maintain N-1 contingency. It was completed on November 16, 2009.

In 2010, 3 replacement and higher steel poles (381–383) were used due to the construction of Balagtas Interchange, with NAPOCOR-era steel poles 381 and 382 which are both anchor towers and have flag tower design were reused as part of Hermosa–San Jose line while pole 383 (of suspension tower or flag design) was retired.

The Hermosa–Balintawak Transmission Line Relocation project involved the relocation of its San Simon–Pulilan segment along NLEx using 58 steel poles (45 replacement and 13 existing poles) and 4 lattice towers (2 replacement and 2 existing towers). Contract effectivity of the project is on February 18, 2008. Land and right-of-way acquisition for the 4 lattice towers of the said transmission line segment which are located along Candaba Viaduct of NLEx  (255, 256, 266, and 267; with 255 and 256 are replacement structures while 266 and 267 use NAPOCOR-era towers 264 and 265) were done from 2008 to January 15, 2009, during the time when TransCo is the operator of the transmission facilities, which was then followed by the land and ROW acquisition for the 58 steel poles (228–254, 257–265, 268–289; with 229–233, 237, 238, 241, 242, 244–246, 248–253, 257–265, 268–275, 277–280, 282, 283, 285–288 are replacement steel poles while 228, 234–236, 239, 240, 243, 247, 254, 276, 281, 284, and 289 use NAPOCOR-era poles 228, 229, 231, 259–261, 266, 267, 271, 276, 283, 301, and 302) from January 15, 2009, up until the completion of the project on March 25, 2011, when NGCP is now the operator of the facilities. Structures (including NAPOCOR-era structures, and structures that will be placed on TransCo-acquired and designated lands and right of way which are the lattice towers) were then later erected and built from early 2010 to March 2011. In June 2011, three months after the completion and energization of the relocated San Simon–Pulilan section of the transmission line, removal of 84 NAPOCOR-era steel poles (228–263, 266–313) and 2 lattice towers (264 and 265) as well as the retirement of 70 out of 84 steel poles (230, 232–258, 262, 263, 268–270, 272–274, 277–282, 284–300, 303–313) that were located along MacArthur Highway from San Simon, Pampanga to Caltex in Calumpit, Bulacan and Pulilan Regional Road from Calumpit to Pulilan Exit in Pulilan was completed.

One steel pole that was located near Dolores Flyover was relocated at the edge of Jose Abad Santos Avenue while the relocation of the transmission line's San Simon–Pulilan section was ongoing using NAPOCOR-era steel pole 275 which was originally located along MacArthur Highway in Calumpit and now serves as the line's steel pole 167 since 2011, while pole 167 itself was retired.

In 2019, NGCP constructed new steel pole 516 located inside Balintawak substation.

Currently, the San Fernando segment of the line is undergoing relocation through the Relocation of Hermosa–Duhat Transmission Line project to alleviate heavy traffic along Jose Abad Santos Avenue due to the presence of its electric poles standing on the highway itself, and to pave the way for the expansion of some segments of the avenue, particularly at Barangay Dolores. The said transmission project was started in 2018 with the construction of bored piles that will serve as foundation for the replacement steel poles.

Route description
The Hermosa–Duhat–Balintawak Transmission Line passes through the cities of Quezon City, Caloocan, and Valenzuela in Metro Manila, Meycauayan and Malolos in Bulacan, and San Fernando in Pampanga and municipalities of Marilao, Bocaue, Balagtas, Guiguinto, Plaridel, Pulilan, and Calumpit in Bulacan, Apalit, San Simon, Santo Tomas, Bacolor, Guagua, and Lubao in Pampanga, and Hermosa in Bataan. It is located within the service area of NGCP's North Luzon Operations and Maintenance (NLOM) Districts 5 (West Central Plain), 6 (South Central Plain), and 7 (National Capital Region).

Hermosa–Duhat

Hermosa to San Fernando
The transmission line starts at Hermosa Substation and run parallel with Jose Abad Santos Avenue until NLEx San Fernando Exit. It enters Pampanga upon passing the Bataan–Pampanga welcome arch and continues straightforward. While running parallel with the said avenue, it intersects with Hermosa–Guagua in Lubao, Mexico–Hermosa in Lubao, Guagua, Bacolor and San Fernando, and Hermosa–Malolos–San Jose lines in Guagua. It then utilize the eastern side of the avenue upon approaching Santa Barbara Bridge.

It passes through the lahar-filled Bacolor and enters San Fernando upon passing the city's welcome arch. The line again utilizes the western side of the avenue after Villa del Sol in Magliman, San Fernando. It crosses into Lazatin Boulevard upon passing Lazatin Flyover and passes through residential areas and establishments located within San Fernando. The power line then crosses into MacArthur Highway upon passing Dolores Flyover and continues on a straight direction until San Fernando Exit.

San Fernando to Bocaue
The line enters the western side of NLEx via San Fernando Exit and runs parallel into it until Smart Connect Interchange. After entering NLEx, it intersects with Mexico–Hermosa line for a fifth and final time. It continues on a straight route, intersecting with Mexico–Balintawak and Mexico–Calumpit lines in Santo Tomas, and passes through San Simon Exit (where the line left the NLEx alignment prior to the relocation of its San Simon–Pulilan section in 2011). The line continues on a straight alignment and runs parallel with Candaba Viaduct where it crosses Pampanga River and Apalit Bypass Road, and passes through rice paddies and swampland in Apalit, Calumpit, and Pulilan. It then enters Bulacan after passing the former location of a billboard located near steel pole 271.

It intersects with the under-construction Hermosa–San Jose 500,000 volt transmission line a few meters after exiting Pampanga and entering Bulacan, with a lattice tower of the said power line is located near steel pole 273. The power line then passes into Pulilan Exit (where it reentered the NLEx alignment from 1994 to 2011), continues straightforward, intersects with Hermosa–Malolos–San Jose in Plaridel and Mexico–Balintawak lines in Guiguinto for the second time, passes into Balagtas Interchange, Bigaa and Santa Maria Rivers, Bocaue Exit, Bocaue Toll Plaza, and Ciudad de Victoria Interchange. It turns left into Meralco Duhat Substation a few meters after passing Ciudad de Victoria interchange, where the line's Hermosa–Duhat section ends.

Duhat–Balintawak

Bocaue to Quezon City
The line turns left upon entering NLEx, continues on a straight direction, and enters Metro Manila after steel pole 465. It then utilizes the eastern side of NLEx after steel pole 488 and leaves the expressway at Smart Connect Interchange. After leaving NLEx, it passes through residential areas, establishments, and institutions located within Caloocan and Quezon City, and crosses into Quirino Highway before the transmission line ends at Balintawak Substation, after crossing F. Carlos St. Inside the said substation are steel pole 515 and new pole 516 (with steel pole 516 was later placed with insulators used on line 3 of San Jose–Balintawak transmission line in September 2020).

Technical description
The transmission line is a single-circuit, double-bundle power line and the contractor for its construction is Herrera Engineering Corporation (HEC).

Prior to the completion of the line's cut-in connection to Meralco Duhat substation, it was a one-part power line and had direct tap connection. It originally had a length of 91 km (57 mi) from 1994 to November 16, 2009. The line was extended to 91.59 km upon the completion of its cut-in connection to Duhat substation in November 2009 and then reduced to its current length of 87.54 km (54.39 mi) when its San Simon–Pulilan segment was relocated along North Luzon Expressway (NLEx) in March 2011. Since November 16, 2009 upon the completion of the cut-in connection to the said substation, it is now a two-part transmission line thus the line is referred to as Hermosa–Duhat from Hermosa Substation to Duhat Substation and Duhat–Balintawak from Duhat Substation to Balintawak Substation since the said date.

Steel poles can have flag (suspension and anchor variants) and triangle tower designs. From 1994 to 2019, steel pole 424 originally had triangle tower design before being changed to asymmetrical due to the construction of Ciudad de Victoria interchange. Cement pole that is used on the line's intersection with Hermosa–Guagua 69kV line and steel pole 516 located inside Balintawak Substation also have an asymmetrical tower design. Lattice towers, however, have incomplete tower design. Portal towers are used on portions of the line where it intersects with another power line. Each steel poles, lattice towers, and portal towers have three insulators.

The power line originally had 504 steel poles (1–55, 58–98, 100–263, 266–496, 500–511, and 515), 11 lattice towers (56, 57, 99, 264, 265, 497–499, and 512–514), and 12 portal towers totaling to 527 structures when it was first commissioned in June 1994.

Before the Lahar-Affected Relocation and Hermosa-Balintawak Relocation projects in 2003 and 2011, respectively, it had:
 32 steel poles (126-158; located at the western side of Jose Abad Santos Avenue (Olongapo–Gapan Road); retired except steel pole 127 which was used on a cut-in connection to Meralco Duhat Substation)
 3 portal towers (located between steel poles 139 and 140, and 144 and 145; retired)
 1 h-frame wood pole (used to replace steel pole 143 because it was washed out by lahars from Mount Pinatubo; retired)
 84 steel poles and 2 lattice towers located along MacArthur Highway and Pulilan Regional Road, respectively (228–313; steel poles 228, 229, 231, 259, 260, 261, 266, 267, 271, 275, 276, 283, 301, and 302 and lattice towers 264 and 265 were reused. The other 70 steel poles (230, 232–258, 262, 263, 268–270, 272–274, 277–282, 284–300, and 303–313) located in this segment, however, were retired.)

As of 2019, the transmission line consists of:
484 steel poles (Hermosa–Duhat segment: 1–55, 58–98, 100–125, RHB-01–RHB-30, 159–254, 257–265, 268–289, 314–429, and 3 steel poles used on its cut-in connection to Meralco Duhat substation in Duhat, Bocaue, Bulacan; Duhat–Balintawak segment: 5 steel poles used on the line's cut-in connection to the said substation including original steel pole 127 along NLEx, 430–496, 500–511, 515, and 516)
13 lattice towers (Hermosa–Duhat segment: 56, 57, 99, 255, 256, 266, and 267; Duhat–Balintawak segment: 497–499, 512–514)
9 portal towers
1 concrete pole (58A)

Overall, it has 507 transmission structures, with the line's Hermosa–Duhat segment consists of 415 structures while Duhat–Balintawak has 92 structures.

By province, the line has 4 structures in Bataan (4 steel poles (1–4)), 271 in Pampanga (257 steel poles (5–55, 58–98, 100–125, RHB-01–RHB-30, 159–254, 257–265, 268–271), 7 lattice towers (56, 57, 99, 255, 256, 266, and 267), 6 portal towers, and 1 concrete pole (58A)), 181 in Bulacan (178 steel poles (272–289, 314–429, 8 steel poles used on the transmission line's cut-in connection to Duhat Substation, 430–465) and 3 portal towers), and 51 in Metro Manila (45 steel poles (466–496, 500–511, 515, 516) and 6 lattice towers (497–499, 512–514)).

Controversy
The planned realignment of the transmission line's San Fernando segment along Jose Abad Santos Avenue was met with opposition from businessmen and residents. Fernandino Jasa stakeholders, a group composed of owners of different businesses and residents of Villa Barosa Subdivision, expressed their concerns over the potential risks and hazards on their health and properties if such relocation is implemented. One such risk is the probability of the lines being cut and swung towards buildings during natural calamities like earthquakes and typhoons, endangering human lives and properties. Levy Laus, chairman of the Laus Group of Companies, pointed out the negative impacts of the transmission line to the aesthetics of the city and the potential development of highrises and skyscrapers along the avenue. Several residents also took note of the lack of coordination between them and the NGCP. Laus suggested that steel poles be instead relocated in less populated areas like open areas or paddy fields.

Gallery

Notes

References

Energy infrastructure completed in 1994
Transmission lines in the Philippines